Raj Bhavan, Odisha may refer to:

 Raj Bhavan, Bhubaneswar, official residence of the governor of Odisha, located in Bhubaneswar.
 Raj Bhavan, Puri, official residence of the governor of Odisha, located in Puri.